Acer velutinum is a species of tree in the Sapindaceae family. It is referred to by the common names velvet maple or Persian maple, and is native to Azerbaijan, Georgia and northern Iran. It grows in the moist Caspian Hyrcanian mixed forests as wells as parts of Eastern Georgia.

It is a tall deciduous tree growing to over 40 m tall.

References

velutinum
Plants described in 1846
Trees of Azerbaijan
Flora of Iran
Flora of Georgia (country)
Taxa named by Pierre Edmond Boissier